Art + Soul Oakland is an annual summer art and music festival held in downtown Oakland, California, first held in 2001. It is held in and around Frank Ogawa Plaza. Past performers have included Zendaya, Lisa Loeb, Leela James, Vintage Trouble, Con Funk Shun, Tristan Prettyman, Pacific Mambo Orchestra, San Francisco-based Luce, Lyrics Born, Meshell Ndegeocello, Souls of Mischief, and Los Rakas.

References

External links

Art + Soul Oakland website
official trailer for Art + Soul Oakland 2012 at YouTube

Festivals in the San Francisco Bay Area
Culture of Oakland, California
2000 establishments in California
Music of the San Francisco Bay Area
PEN Oakland/Josephine Miles Literary Award winners